The Citroën C5 Aircross is a compact crossover SUV produced by the French automaker Citroën since late 2017. It started as the Citroën Aircross concept car which was unveiled at the 2015 Shanghai Auto Show. The production version was officially presented for the Chinese market at the 2017 Shanghai Auto Show.

Overview
In Europe, the model was presented at the 2018 Geneva Motor Show, and sales began later that year with the 2019 model. In 2018 production of the C5 Aircross started as well in France at the PSA plant in Rennes. The model takes advantage of the 100-million-euro investment share of Groupe PSA. The C5 Aircross is also assembled in India as CKD since January 2021.

Features
On the technical side, the C5 Aircross is part of the Citroën "Advanced Comfort" program. Efforts have focused, in particular, on interior space and interior luminosity (notably through a large panoramic sliding roof) and on suspension comfort, via a new progressive hydraulic thrust system.

The C5 Aircross is equipped with optional 12.3-inch TFT digital dashboard screen and an 8-inch capacitive HD touchscreen. In terms of driving aids, the C5 Aircross offers optional automatic emergency braking, blind spot monitoring or adaptive cruise control (with automatic stop). A torque vectoring system marketed as the Grip Control and start assist are also available. Lane-keeping assistance and traffic sign recognition were optional.

The European version has a choice of two petrol engines: the 1.2-litre PureTech  and the 1.6-litre PureTech , as well as two diesel versions: the 1.5-litre BlueHDi  and the 2.0-litre BlueHDi . Depending on the version, these different engines can be coupled to a six-speed manual gearbox, or an eight-speed EAT8 automatic transmission.

The C5 Aircross is also the first Citroën vehicle equipped with a plug-in hybrid powertrain. Introduced in November 2019, the plug-in hybrid system combines a PureTech 180 gasoline engine that develops  with an  electric motor, with a fully-electric range of around  under WLTP testing standards.

China 
Sales in China started in the fall of 2017 for the 2018 model year. The engine options in China are the standard modern turbocharged 1.6-litre (350THP) and 1.8-litre (380THP) engines that are used as well in the Chinese Citroën C5 and C6 and the Peugeot 4008 and 5008 and the Peugeot 508 and some DS models. All these models use the 6 speed third-generation Tiptronic automatic transmission. The European and Chinese cars are largely identical, apart from the engine and gearbox options. In the interior, the European version has three individual adjustable and foldable seats, while the Chinese model has a fixed folding 60:40 bench at the back.

Plug-in hybrid 
In November 2022, the C5 Aircross received a  plug-in hybrid version. Its petrol engine develops , unlike the  hybrid version that also has electric range.

Facelift 
The European C5 Aircross gets a facelift in January 2022, with a major redesign of the front end, minor redesign of the rear end and new interior features.

The Chinese version is facelifted in July 2022. With the similar exterior changes to the European model, it was renamed from Dongfeng Citroën Tianyi C5 Aircross to Dongfeng Citroën Tianyi Beyond (or more rarely Dongfeng Citroën Tianyi Beyond C5 Aircross, as the name "C5 Aircross" is still present on the tailgate).

In India, the facelift model was launched in September 2022. and then in Egypt in November 2022.

Concept model

Sales

Technical data

Europe

China

Notes

References

External links

 Official website (United Kingdom)

C5 Aircross
Compact sport utility vehicles
Crossover sport utility vehicles
Cars introduced in 2017
2020s cars